Mathilde Sénéchal (born 24 January 1998) is a French long-distance runner. In 2019, she competed in the senior women's race at the 2019 IAAF World Cross Country Championships held in Aarhus, Denmark. She finished in 60th place.

In 2017, she won the silver medal in the women's 3000 metres event at the 2017 European Athletics U20 Championships held in Grosseto, Italy.

In 2018, she won the gold medal in the women's 5000 metres event at the 2018 Mediterranean Athletics U23 Championships held in Jesolo, Italy.

In 2019, she competed in the women's 5000 metres event at the 2019 European Athletics U23 Championships held in Gävle, Sweden. She finished in 18th place.

References

External links 
 

Living people
1998 births
Place of birth missing (living people)
French female long-distance runners
French female cross country runners
20th-century French women
21st-century French women